Patricia Guerrero (born December 7, 1971) is an American judge who is the 29th Chief Justice of California and served as an associate justice of the Supreme Court of California from March 2022 through December 2022. Guerrero was previously an associate justice of the California Court of Appeal for the Fourth District, Division One from 2017 to 2022, a judge on the San Diego County Superior Court from 2013 to 2017 and an assistant U.S. attorney in the United States District Court for the Southern District of California from 2002 to 2003. On August 10, 2022, Guerrero was nominated to the position of Chief Justice of California by Governor Gavin Newsom. She is a Democrat.

Education 
Guerrero was born in California to parents from Mexico. She was raised in the Imperial Valley, California. At the age of 16, Guerrero worked at a grocery store. Guerrero graduated from the University of California, Berkeley in 1994. She earned a Juris Doctor from Stanford Law School in 1997.

Career 
Guerrero performed pro bono work as a member of the Immigration Justice Project advisory board.
From 2002 to 2003, Guerrero served as an assistant U.S. attorney in the Southern District of California. She joined the law firm of Latham & Watkins as an associate and was promoted to partner in 2006.

Judicial service 
In 2013, Guerrero became a judge on the San Diego County Superior Court and served as the supervising judge for its family law division in 2017.  Later in 2017, she became an appellate justice on the Court of Appeal for the Fourth District, Division One, the state intermediate appellate court with jurisdiction over appeals from San Diego and Imperial counties.

In February 2022, Guerrero was nominated by Governor Gavin Newsom to replace Associate Justice Mariano-Florentino Cuéllar on the Supreme Court of California. Guerrero was approved by a 3-0 vote of the Commission on Judicial Appointments on March 22, 2022 and is the first Latina to serve on the Supreme Court of California. On August 10, 2022, Governor Newsom nominated Guerrero to serve as the Chief Justice of California. On August 26, she was confirmed by the Commission on Judicial Appointments. , following the 2022 election, she was retained by California voters to be elevated as the chief justice with 70% of an affirmative vote. She was sworn in as chief justice on January 2, 2023.

References 

|-

Living people
Year of birth missing (living people)
21st-century American women lawyers
21st-century American lawyers
21st-century American women judges
21st-century American judges
American judges of Mexican descent
American lawyers of Mexican descent
American people of Mexican descent
American women judges
Assistant United States Attorneys
California Democrats
California state court judges
Chief Justices of California
Judges of the California Courts of Appeal
Justices of the Supreme Court of California
People associated with Latham & Watkins
Stanford Law School alumni
Superior court judges in the United States
University of California, Berkeley alumni
Women chief justices of state supreme courts in the United States
1971 births